Hooey was a humour magazine published by Popular Magazines in the 1930s. The magazine presented spoof ads and articles much in the manner popularised by the 1950s magazine Mad.

References

External links
 Henri Weiner: Cartoonist for Hooey magazine
 Hooey magazine entry at Time magazine website

Satirical magazines published in the United States
Defunct magazines published in the United States
Humor magazines
Magazines with year of establishment missing
Magazines with year of disestablishment missing